The Road to Glory is a 1936 dramatic film depiction of World War I trench warfare in France directed by Howard Hawks, starring Fredric March, Warner Baxter, Lionel Barrymore, and June Lang, and  produced by 20th Century Fox.
It is vaguely inspired by Roland Dorgelès’ 1919 novel and Raymond Bernard’s 1932 Les Croix de Bois (Wooden Crosses), though the film credits don’t mention them.

Plot

Cast

 Fredric March as Lieutenant Michel Denet
 Warner Baxter as Captain Paul La Roche
 Lionel Barrymore as Papa La Roche / Private Morin
 June Lang as Monique La Coste
 Gregory Ratoff as Russian Sergeant
 Victor Kilian as Tall Sergeant
 Paul Stanton as Captain
 John Qualen as Scared Soldier
 Julius Tannen as Lieutenant Tannen
 Theodore von Eltz as Major
 Paul Fix as Second Volunteer
 Leonid Kinskey as Soldier
 Jacques Lory as Courier
 Jacques Vanaire as Doctor
 Edythe Raynore  as Nurse
George Warrington as Jean Dulac

References

External links
The Road to Glory in The New York Times

The Road to Glory at Virtual History
The Road to Glory at Turner Classic Movies
The Road to Glory at Letterboxd.com

1936 films
1930s English-language films
1930s war drama films
American war drama films
1936 drama films
American black-and-white films
Films produced by Darryl F. Zanuck
Films directed by Howard Hawks
20th Century Fox films
American World War I films
1930s American films